The Central Tai languages include southern dialects of Zhuang, and various Nung and Tày dialects of northern Vietnam.

Central Tai languages differ from Northern Tai languages in that Central Tai distinguishes unaspirated and aspirated onsets, while Northern Tai generally does not (Li 1977). Southwestern Tai also displays this kind of aspiration contrast.

Classification
William Gedney considers Central Tai to be more closely related to Southwestern Tai than to Northern Tai, while André-Georges Haudricourt argues for a closer relation to Northern Tai. Pittayaporn's (2009) tentative tree of the Tai branch, however, considers Central Tai to be paraphyletic.

Certain languages in predominantly Central Tai-speaking areas, such as Caolan and Nùng An in northern Vietnam, display Northern Tai features as well. These appear to be mixed languages that are not fully Central Tai or Northern Tai. Jerold A. Edmondson calls Caolan a "tertium quid."

Jerold Edmondson's (2014) computational phylogenetic analysis of the Tai languages shows Tay and Nung to be coherent branches under Central Tai.
Central Tai
Core Central Tai: Nung Chau, Pingxiang Zhuang, Leiping Zhuang, Ningming Zhuang
Tay: Tay Bao Lac, Tay Khanh Trung, Cao Lan
Nung: Nung Chao (Longzhou Zhuang), Nùng Phạn Slinh, Nung Inh, Western Nung/Nung Din (Nong Zhuang), Nung Yang (Yang Zhuang), Nung An

Languages
Many Central Tai languages are known as Nong 侬 (Nùng in Vietnamese) or Dai 岱 (Tày in Vietnamese).

China
Longzhou
Ningming
Nong Zhuang
Dai Zhuang
Min Zhuang
Yang Zhuang (different from Yang)
Pyang Zhuang
Myang Zhuang

Vietnam
Nung
Nùng Phạn Slinh
Nùng Cháo
Nùng Inh
Nùng An
Nùng Giang
Nùng Dín (=Western Nùng or Nong Zhuang)
Tày
Tày Bảo Lạc
Tày Trùng Khánh

References

Citations

Sources 

 Li, Fang-kuei. 1977. Handbook of Comparative Tai. Honolulu, Hawaii: University of Hawaiʼi Press.
 Pittayaporn, Pittayawat. 2009. The Phonology of Proto-Tai. Ph.D. dissertation. Department of Linguistics, Cornell University.

Tai languages